Benin is divided into 12 departments (French: départements), and subdivided into 77 communes.

On the third level are the arrondissements of Benin.

Departments 

In 1999, the previous six departments were each split into two halves, forming the current 12. The six new departments were assigned official capitals in 2008.

Communes

References

 
Benin
Benin